Conor Brennan (born 30 March 1994) is a Northern Irish footballer who plays as a goalkeeper for Scottish League Two club Stenhousemuir.

Brennan has previously played for Kilmarnock, Stranraer, Raith Rovers, Ballymena United, Greenock Morton, Brechin City, Dumbarton and  East Kilbride

Career
Brennan made his debut for Kilmarnock in a 2–0 victory over Dundee United on 3 October 2014, after replacing injured Killie goalkeeper Craig Samson at half time.

In July 2015, Brennan signed on loan with Scottish League One side Stranraer on a six-month deal. He was recalled by Kilmarnock on 1 September 2015, after the club loaned fellow goalkeeper Devlin McKay to Derby County. On 23 May 2016, he was one of six players released at the end of their contract.

On 27 August 2016, Brennan signed for Scottish Championship club Raith Rovers on a contract until January 2017. He made his debut the same day, as Raith Rovers drew 2–2 away to Dundee United. On 12 January 2017 Brennan signed an extension to his contract keeping him at the club until the end of the season.

After leaving Raith, Brennan signed with NIFL Premiership side Ballymena United before returning to Scotland to sign with Greenock Morton on 18 January 2018.

During the 2018 close season, Brennan signed for Brechin City. He left the club in January 2019 and signed for Dumbarton. After impressing in his two appearances for the club he signed a new one year deal in June of the same year. He left the club in July 2020 after spending the 2019–20 season as the club's number one and signed for Lowland Football League side East Kilbride.

Career statistics

References

External links

Conor Brennan Official Profile at the Irish Football Association

1994 births
Living people
Association footballers from Northern Ireland
Kilmarnock F.C. players
Stranraer F.C. players
Raith Rovers F.C. players
Ballymena United F.C. players
Greenock Morton F.C. players
Association football goalkeepers
Scottish Professional Football League players
Northern Ireland youth international footballers
Northern Ireland under-21 international footballers
Brechin City F.C. players
Rangers F.C. non-playing staff
East Kilbride F.C. players
Lowland Football League players
Stenhousemuir F.C. players